The 1993 Campeonato Nacional, known as Campeonato Nacional Copa Banco del Estado 1993 for sponsorship purposes, was the 61st season of top-flight football in Chile. Colo-Colo won its 19th title following a 3–0 home win against Unión Española on 2 January 1994. Unión Española also qualified for the next Copa Libertadores as Liguilla winners.

Final table

Results

Top goalscorers

Liguilla Pre-Copa Libertadores

Preliminary round 

* Qualified as "Best Loser"

Unión Española qualified for the 1994 Copa Libertadores

Copa CONMEBOL 1993 play-off

Preliminary round

Final 

Colo-Colo qualified for the 1993 Copa CONMEBOL

Promotion/relegation Liguilla

Regional Atacama and Coquimbo Unido play the 1994 Primera División season

See also
1993 Copa Chile

Notes

References
RSSSF Page

Primera División de Chile seasons
Chile
1993 in Chilean football